Alicia D'Anvers [née Clarke] (baptised 1668–1725) was an English poet known for her satires of academic life.

Biography 
Born in Oxford, her father, Samuel Clarke (bap. 1624, d. 1669), was superior beadle of civil law and first architypographus, or director of printing, for the University of Oxford. He died when she was two. She married barrister Knightley D'Anvers (c.1670–1740), son of Jane Knightly and physician Daniel D'Anvers, in 1688. D'Anvers had no children.

D'Anvers is known to have published two poems with a third generally attributed to her. A Poem Upon His Sacred Majesty, His Voyage For Holland: By way of Dialogue, Between Belgia and Britannia (1691) was dedicated to Queen Mary; it is a poetic dialogue between Britannia and Belgia which addresses criticisms that King William III had divided loyalties between the Netherlands, the country of his birth, and Britain. According to Germaine Greer et al., it is "as dull as might be expected," but another commentator calls it politically "daring." The second and third poems — Academia, or, The Humours of the University of Oxford. In Burlesque Verse (1691) and The Oxford-Act: a Poem (1693) — satirise elements of academic life at the University of Oxford. These latter were part of a long tradition of university satire not usually practiced by women. D'Anvers would seem to have been quite familiar with college politics, and both poems target the alleged sexual activities of Oxford students. The Oxford-Act is particularly bawdy, which may explain why it was published anonymously. Academia, or, The Humours of the University of Oxford was D'Anvers' most popular poem; told from the perspective of a town servant, it lampoons the current state of the university through the eyes of a visiting country bumpkin, one John Blunder, and consists of 1,411 lines of "robust colloquial iambic tetrameters, called hudibrastics."

One modern commentator has described D'Anvers as "that splendid Oxford satirist" though another characterizes Academia as "ribald, scurrilous doggerel." Her work has been anthologized in Kissing the Rod (1988), and Early Modern Women Poets.

Works 

 A Poem Upon His Sacred Majesty, His Voyage For Holland: By way of Dialogue, Between Belgia and Britannia. London, Printed for Tho. Bever, at the Hand and Star, near Temple Barr, in Fleet-street, 1691.
 Academia, or, The Humours of the University of Oxford. In Burlesque Verse. London: Printed and sold by Randal Taylor near Stationers Hall, 1691 (repr. 1716, 1730).
 The Oxford-Act: a Poem. London: Printed for Randal Taylor, 1693.

Notes

References 
Blain, Virginia, eds. "D'Anvers , Alicia." The Feminist Companion to Literature in English. New Haven and London: Yale UP, 1990. 264.  (Internet Archive).
D'Anvers, Alicia. A Poem Upon His Sacred Majesty, His Voyage for Holland; Academia - or, the Humours of the University of Oxford in Burlesque Verse; and The Oxford-Act: A Poem. Ashgate, 2003. .
Greer, Germaine, eds. Kissing the Rod: An Anthology of Seventeenth-Century Women's Verse. New York: Farrar Straus Giroux, 1988. 376–382. .
Nelson, Holly Faith. “D'Anvers , Alicia (bap. 1668, d. 1725).” Oxford Dictionary of National Biography. Ed. H. C. G. Matthew and Brian Harrison. Oxford: OUP, 2004. 30 Dec. 2006.
Simonova, N. "D’Anvers, Alicia." The Palgrave Encyclopedia of Early Modern Women's Writing. Palgrave Macmillan, Cham, 2021. Accessed 220 August 2022. https://doi.org/10.1007/978-3-030-01537-4_163-2

See also
Campus novel
List of satirists and satires
School and university in literature

External links

1660s births
1725 deaths
English women poets
17th-century English women writers
17th-century English writers
18th-century British women writers
18th-century British writers
Satirists